

The Caspar C 26 was a sports aircraft developed in Germany in the mid-1920s.

Design and development
The C.26 was a biplane of all-wood construction. One copy of the C.26 was built, receiving the civil registration D-674. It took part in the 1925 Deutschen Rundflug.

Specifications

References

C026
Biplanes
Single-engined tractor aircraft
Aircraft first flown in 1925